Porpax risi is a species of dragonfly in the family Libellulidae. It is found in Angola, Malawi, Mozambique, Zambia, and Zimbabwe. Its natural habitats are swamps and intermittent freshwater marshes.

References

Libellulidae
Odonata of Africa
Insects described in 1958
Taxa named by Elliot Pinhey
Taxonomy articles created by Polbot